Deinopis longipes is a species of net-casting spider (family Deinopidae). It is found throughout Central America.

This spider has a very slim, elongated body around 16 mm in length. As with other members of the family, it hunts at night, constructing a silken net which it uses to snare passing prey.

References

External links
americanarachnology.org: Photo - Deinopis longipes, female, Costa Rica

Deinopidae
Spiders of Central America
Spiders described in 1902